Alexandre-Félix-Joseph Ribot (7 February 184213 January 1923) was a French politician, four times Prime Minister.

Early career
Ribot was born in Saint-Omer, Pas-de-Calais. After a brilliant academic career at the University of Paris, where he was lauréat of the faculty of law, he rapidly made his mark at the bar. He was secretary of the conference of advocates and one of the founders of the Sociéte de legislation comparée. During 1875 and 1876 he was successively director of criminal affairs and secretary-general at the ministry of justice.

Representative
In 1877 he entered politics, playing a conspicuous part on the committee of legal resistance during the Brogue ministry; in the following year he was returned to the chamber as a moderate republican member for Boulogne, in his native département of Pas-de-Calais.

His impassioned yet reasoned eloquence gave him an influence which was increased by his articles in the Parlement in which he opposed violent measures against the unauthorized congregations. He devoted himself especially to financial questions, and in 1882 was reporter of the budget. He became one of the most prominent republican opponents of the Radical party, distinguishing himself by his attacks on the short-lived Gambetta ministry. He refused to vote the credits demanded by the Ferry cabinet for the Tonkin expedition, and helped Georges Clemenceau overthrow the ministry in 1885. At the general election of that year he was a victim of the Republican rout in the Pas-de-Calais, and did not re-enter the chamber till 1887.

Cabinet member
After 1889 he sat for Saint-Omer. His fear of the Boulangist movement converted him to the policy of "Republican Concentration," and he entered office in 1890 as foreign minister in the Freycinet cabinet. He had an intimate acquaintance and sympathy with English' institutions,' and two of his published works – an address, Biographie de Lord Erskine (1866), and Etude sur l'acte du 5 avril 1873 pour l'etablissement d'une cour supreme de justice en Angleterre (1874) – deal with English law; he also gave a fresh and highly important direction to French policy by the understanding with Russia, which was declared to the world by the visit of the French fleet to Kronstadt in 1891, and which subsequently ripened into a formal treaty of alliance. He retained his post in Émile Loubet's ministry (February–November 1892), and on its defeat he became president of the council (prime minister), retaining the direction of foreign affairs. The government resigned in March 1893 over the refusal of the chamber to accept the Senate's amendments to the budget. On the election of Félix Faure as president of the Republic in January 1895, Ribot again became premier and minister of finance. On 10 June he was able to make the first official announcement of a definite alliance with Russia. On 30 October the government was defeated on the question of the Chemin de fer du Sud, and resigned office.

The real reason of its fall was the mismanagement of the Second Madagascar expedition, the cost of which in men and money exceeded all expectations, and the alarming social conditions at home, as indicated by the strike at Carmaux. After the fall of Jules Méline's ministry in 1898 M. Ribot tried in vain to form a cabinet of "conciliation." He was elected, at the end of 1898, president of the important commission on education, in which he advocated the adoption of a modern system of education. The policy of the Waldeck-Rousseau ministry on the religious teaching congregations broke up the Republican party, and Ribot was among the seceders; but at the general election of 1902, though he himself secured re-election, his policy suffered a severe check.

He actively opposed the policy of the Combes ministry and denounced the alliance with Jean Léon Jaurès, and on 13 January 1905 he was one of the leaders of the opposition which brought about the fall of the cabinet. Although he had been most violent in denouncing the anti-clerical policy of the Combes cabinet, he now announced his willingness to recognize a new régime to replace the Concordat of 1801, and gave the government his support in the establishment of the Associations culturelles, while he secured some mitigation of the seventies attending the separation.

He was re-elected deputy for Saint-Omer in 1906. In the same year he became a member of the Académie Française in succession to the duc d'Audiffret-Pasquier; he was already a member of the Academy of Moral and Political Science. In justification of his policy in opposition he published in 1905 two volumes of his Discours politiques.

On 3 January 1909, Ribot was elected a member of the French Senate, and in February of the following year was offered, but refused, the Ministry for Foreign Affairs in the Monis cabinet. After the formation of the Poincaré Government on 14 January 1912, Ribot took the place of Léon Bourgeois as president of the committee appointed to deal with the Franco-German treaty, the necessity for the ratification of which he demonstrated. In 1913 he was an unsuccessful candidate for the presidency of the Republic, and on the fall of Barthou's Government was invited by Poincaré, who was now President, to form a Cabinet, but refused. In 1914 he became, with Jean Dupuy, leader of the Left Republican group which refused to accept the decisions of the Radical Socialist congress at Pau in October 1913.

First Premiership
On 9 June 1914, Ribot became Prime Minister and Minister of Justice, but his Government was bitterly assailed by the Radical Socialists as well as other groups, and only lasted one day.

World War I
With the outbreak of World War I Ribot's great reputation as an expert in finance and foreign affairs brought him effectively into office. On 27 August 1914 he became Minister of Finance in Viviani's Ministry of National Defence, an office which he retained when, on 28 October 1915, Aristide Briand succeeded Viviani as Prime Minister.

On 7 February 1916 he visited London and held a conference with the Chancellor of the Exchequer at the Treasury. When Briand reconstituted his Cabinet, in December 1916, Ribot retained the portfolio of Finance. On the fall of the Briand Ministry, President Poincaré again called upon Ribot to form a government, and this time he consented, himself taking the portfolio of Foreign Affairs in addition to the premiership (19 March). In the statement of his policy made to the Chamber on 21 March he declared this to be "to recover the provinces torn from us in the past, to obtain the reparations and guarantees due to France, and to prepare a durable peace based on respect for the rights and liberty of peoples." On 31 July, in a reply to the German Chancellor Georg Michaelis, he admitted that in 1917 an agreement had been made with Tsar Nicholas to erect the German territories on the left bank of the Rhine into an autonomous state, but denied that there had been any question of their annexation to France.

End of political career
Ribot's final ministry was during the most dismal part of the First World War, seeing the failure of the Nivelle Offensive and the famous mutiny of the French soldiers which followed. Following the decision to dismiss Interior Minister Louis Malvy, his government resigned office on 2 September, but he accepted the Ministry of Foreign Affairs in the Painlevé cabinet constituted six days later. He resigned office finally on 16 October, owing to the violent criticism of his refusal to fall into the "trap" of the German peace offers.

Ribot left politics, and died in Paris on 13 January 1923 at the age of 80.

The main grammar school (lycée) in Saint-Omer, the Lycée Alexandre Ribot, bears his name today.

Ribot's 1st Ministry, 6 December 189211 January 1893
Alexandre Ribot – President of the Council and Minister of Foreign Affairs
Charles de Freycinet – Minister of War
Émile Loubet – Minister of the Interior
Maurice Rouvier – Minister of Finance
Léon Bourgeois – Minister of Justice
Auguste Bourdeau – Minister of Marine and Colonies
Charles Dupuy – Minister of Public Instruction, Fine Arts, and Worship
Jules Develle – Minister of Agriculture
Jules Viette – Minister of Public Works
Jules Siegfried – Minister of Commerce and Industry

Changes
13 December 1892 – Pierre Tirard succeeds Rouvier as Minister of Finance.

Ribot's 2nd Ministry, 11 January 18934 April 1893
Alexandre Ribot – President of the Council and Minister of the Interior
Jules Develle – Minister of Foreign Affairs
Jules Léon Loizillon – Minister of War
Pierre Tirard – Minister of Finance
Léon Bourgeois – Minister of Justice
Adrien Barthélemy Louis Henri Rieunier – Minister of Marine
Charles Dupuy – Minister of Public Instruction, Fine Arts, and Worship
Albert Viger – Minister of Agriculture
Jules Siegfried – Minister of Commerce, Industry, and the Colonies

Ribot's 3rd Ministry, 26 January 18951 November 1895
Alexandre Ribot – President of the Council and Minister of Finance
Gabriel Hanotaux – Minister of Foreign Affairs
Émile Zurlinden – Minister of War
Georges Leygues – Minister of the Interior
Ludovic Trarieux – Minister of Justice
Armand Louis Charles Gustave Besnard – Minister of Marine
Raymond Poincaré – Minister of Public Instruction, Fine Arts, and Worship
Antoine Gadaud – Minister of Agriculture
Émile Chautemps – Minister of Colonies
Ludovic Dupuy-Dutemps – Minister of Public Works
André Lebon – Minister of Posts and Telegraphs and Minister of Commerce and Industry

Ribot's 4th Ministry, 9 June 191413 June 1914
Alexandre Ribot – President of the Council and Minister of Justice
Léon Bourgeois – Minister of Foreign Affairs
Théophile Delcassé – Minister of War
Paul Peytral – Minister of the Interior
Étienne Clémentel – Minister of Finance
Jean-Baptiste Abel – Minister of Labour and Social Security Provisions
Émile Chautemps – Minister of Marine
Arthur Dessoye – Minister of Public Instruction and Fine Arts
Adrien Dariac – Minister of Agriculture
Maurice Maunoury – Minister of Colonies
Jean Dupuy – Minister of Public Works
Marc Réville – Minister of Posts and Telegraphs and Minister of Commerce and Industry

Ribot's 5th Ministry, 20 March 191712 September 1917
Alexandre Ribot – President of the Council and Minister of Foreign Affairs
Paul Painlevé – Minister of War
Louis Malvy – Minister of the Interior
Joseph Thierry – Minister of Finance
Albert Thomas – Minister of Armaments and War Manufacturing
Léon Bourgeois – Minister of Labour and Social Security Provisions
René Viviani – Minister of Justice
Lucien Lacaze – Minister of Marine
Théodore Steeg – Minister of Public Instruction and Fine Arts
Fernand David – Minister of Agriculture
Maurice Viollette – Minister of General Supply and Maritime Transports
André Maginot – Minister of Colonies
Georges Desplas – Minister of Public Works and Transport
Étienne Clémentel – Minister of Posts and Telegraphs and Minister of Commerce and Industry

Changes
4 July 1917 – The office of Minister of Maritime Transports is abolished. Maurice Viollette remains Minister of General Supply.
10 August 1917 – Charles Chaumet succeeds Lacaze as Minister of Marine.
1 September 1917 – Théodore Steeg succeeds Malvy as Minister of the Interior

References

Further reading

External links
 

1842 births
1923 deaths
People from Saint-Omer
Politicians from Hauts-de-France
Progressive Republicans (France)
Republican Federation politicians
Prime Ministers of France
French interior ministers
French Ministers of Finance
Members of the 2nd Chamber of Deputies of the French Third Republic
Members of the 3rd Chamber of Deputies of the French Third Republic
Members of the 4th Chamber of Deputies of the French Third Republic
Members of the 5th Chamber of Deputies of the French Third Republic
Members of the 6th Chamber of Deputies of the French Third Republic
Members of the 7th Chamber of Deputies of the French Third Republic
Members of the 8th Chamber of Deputies of the French Third Republic
Members of the 9th Chamber of Deputies of the French Third Republic
French Senators of the Third Republic
Senators of Pas-de-Calais
Members of the Académie Française
French people of World War I
Corresponding Fellows of the British Academy